Kiri Vehera is an ancient stupa situated in Kataragama, Sri Lanka.  This stupa probably dates back to the 3rd century BC and is believed to have been built by King Mahasena, a regional ruler of Kataragama area. One of the most popular Buddhist pilgrimage sites in the country, Kiri Vehera is among the Solosmasthana, the 16 most sacred Buddhist pilgrimage sites of ancient Sri Lanka. This stupa which is 95 ft. in height with a circumference of 280 ft. is located 800 m North to the famous Ruhunu Maha Kataragama Devalaya. Venerable Kobawaka Dhamminda Thera is the present Chief Prelate of Kirivehera Rajamaha Viharaya.

See also
 Kataragama deviyo
 Kataragama Bodhiya

References and Notes

External links
Kataragama Travel Guide
Kataragama Kiri Vehera website

Archaeological sites in Sri Lanka
Buddhist temples in Monaragala District
Stupas in Sri Lanka